A satsanga, also rendered satsang, refers to the practice of gathering in the company of good people for the performance of devotional activities. It also refers to an audience with a Satguru for yogic instruction. Satsangas are group events, organised by various spiritual organisations.

Etymology 

The word satsanga is derived from Sanskrit, where ‘Sat’ means “purity or truth” and ‘Sanga’ meaning “in group or association”. The main purpose of conducting satsanga by any organisation is for marking an important event in its history. Participating in any satsanga is considered pious in Yogic sciences due to its benefits in spiritual upliftment of an aspirant. Satsangs are generally conducted by any non-religious or spiritual organisations in large groups.

Activities 

The following activities may take place in a satsanga:

 Spiritual discourse
 Chanting of mantras 
 Meditation
 Tree planting
 Cleanliness programmes
 Spiritual stories
 Weddings

See also 
 Guru
 Rishi
 Pandit

References 

Rituals in Hindu worship